Gary Elkins (born 4 May 1966) is an English football manager and former professional footballer.

As a player, he was a defender who notably played in the Premier League for Wimbledon. He also played in the Football League for Fulham,  Exeter City and Swindon Town.

He later spent time as reserve team manager of Didcot Town before being promoted to first team coach. During the 2012–13 season he served as Didcot's first team manager.

Playing career
Steve Perryman revealed that he resigned as manager of Brentford in 1991 because his chairman refused to let him sign Elkins for a nominal fee. The reason given by the chairman was that the player had 'shifty eyes'.

Elkins spent six years playing top flight football for Wimbledon, being a regular in the club's midfield for most of that time.

In 1996, Elkins was signed by Steve McMahon at Swindon Town. He started only 19 games for the club and soon moved into non-league football, while also working as a coach at the Elms Soccer School in Middlesex.

Managerial career
In 2006, Gary joined Didcot Town as reserve team manager but was then promoted the season after to first team coach. At the start of the 2012–13 season Elkins became manager of the club.

Personal life
Elkins now works as PE Instructor at HMP Huntercombe, and is also a first aid teacher.

References

External links

1966 births
Living people
People from Wallingford, Oxfordshire
Association football defenders
English footballers
Fulham F.C. players
Exeter City F.C. players
Wimbledon F.C. players
Swindon Town F.C. players
Didcot Town F.C. players
English Football League players
Premier League players